"Links 2 3 4" (also spelled "Links 2-3-4"; English: "Left 2 3 4") is a song by German Neue Deutsche Härte band Rammstein. It was released as the second single from their third studio album, Mutter, on 14 May 2001. It is a politically charged song, taking aim at early allegations of Nazism against the band by revealing that they are politically left-wing. The song was a top 40 hit in Germany, Austria, and Finland.

Composition
The lyrics were written in response to allegations of fascism/Nazism directed at the band. The chorus states "they want my heart on the right, but when I look down, it beats on the left", implying they are on the left of the political spectrum. 

The refrain “Links, Zwo Drei Vier” (“Left, Two Three Four”) is an allusion to the revolutionary song Einheitsfrontlied, written by Bertolt Brecht for the Communist Party of Germany in the 1930s and re-popularized by Hannes Wader in the German Democratic Republic.

The song uses an alternate pronunciation of the German two, using zwo (pronounced tsvoo) rather than zwei (tsvy). "Zwo" is more commonly used within the German military, or in the Austrian dialect, and this song presents a strong, militaristic theme, 'left – two – three – four' being a common drill instructor's cadence to keep a marching formation in step.

Music video
The music video for the song uses CGI to depict an ant-colony, representing leftists, attacking beetles, representing Nazis. The ants in the video are shown doing human-like tasks such as playing football, watching television, and dancing. 

The band can be seen playing on a movie theater screen, a modified version of their logo with two crossed hammers is shown.

During the movie theater scene the beetles attack, killing members of the ant colony. One ant is seen watching what the monstrous beetles are doing. 

The same ant then goes underground to rally the other ants and kill the beetles which symbolizes how the left may crush the right if they work together.

Live story
The song debuted live in April 2000 on a concert just for members of the fan club. Then it was called simply "Links" and had some minor differences compared to the final version released in Mutter. It was also played during some concerts of Big Day Out 2001. When played live, it usually extends to almost five minutes because of added instrumentals. Since its debut, it has been played in virtually every Rammstein concert, exceptions being most of the shows in Big Day Out 2001 and three consecutive concerts exclusively for members of the Fan Area in October 2004.

Track listing
The single has a B-side of "Halleluja", a track frequently performed live by the band during the Mutter Tour. An early version of it is also available on the Limited Edition release of Mutter, as well as the Japanese edition and Resident Evil Soundtrack.

A DVD version of "Links 2 3 4" contains the audio tracks, as well as a video portion with the official music video, its making-of documentary and a photo gallery. Both videos were subsequently re-released on the Lichtspielhaus DVD.

Maxi-CD 
 "Links 2 3 4" – 3:43
 "Halleluja" – 3:46
 "Links 2 3 4 (Clawfinger Geradeaus Remix)" – 4:28
 "Links 2 3 4 (Westbam Technolectro Mix)" – 5:58
 "Links 2 3 4 (Westbam Hard Rock Cafe Bonus Mix)" – 3:43
 The 2-track CD features "Links 2 3 4" and "Halleluja"

DVD maxi single 

Audio section
 "Links 2 3 4" – 3:43
 "Halleluja" – 3:46
 "Links 2 3 4 (Clawfinger Geradeaus Remix)" – 4:28
 "Links 2 3 4 (Westbam Technolectro Mix)" – 5:58
 "Links 2 3 4 (Westbam Hard Rock Cafe Bonus Mix)" – 3:43

Video section
 "Links 2 3 4 (Video)" – 3:37
 "Links 2 3 4 (Making of)" – 10:11
 Photo gallery

Chart performance

References 

2001 singles
German-language songs
Rammstein songs
Songs against racism and xenophobia
2000 songs
Songs written by Richard Z. Kruspe
Songs written by Paul Landers
Songs written by Till Lindemann
Songs written by Christian Lorenz
Songs written by Oliver Riedel
Songs written by Christoph Schneider
Anti-fascist music